James Clavering, 1st Baronet (1620–1702).

James Clavering may also refer to:

Sir James Clavering, 2nd Baronet (1668–1707), High Sheriff of Northumberland; of the Clavering baronets
Sir James Clavering, 4th Baronet, (1708–1726) of the Clavering baronets
Sir James Clavering, 6th Baronet, (1680–1748) of the Clavering baronets, candidate for Newcastle (UK Parliament constituency)

See also
Clavering (surname)